Vârvoru de Jos is a commune in Dolj County, Oltenia, Romania with a population of 3,408 people. It is composed of eight villages: Bujor, Ciutura, Criva, Dobromira, Drăgoaia, Gabru, Vârvor and Vârvoru de Jos.

References

Communes in Dolj County
Localities in Oltenia